The Last of the Duanes is a lost 1919 silent film western directed by J. Gordon Edwards and starring William Farnum. It is based on the 1914 novel Last of the Duanes by author Zane Grey. The Fox Film Corporation produced and distributed the film.

This was the first of four films based on the novel; a 1924 adaptation starred Tom Mix, a 1930 adaptation starred George O'Brien, and a 1941 adaptation featured George Montgomery.

Cast
 William Farnum as Buck Duane
 Louise Lovely as Jenny Lee
 Harry De Vere as His Uncle
 Charles Clary as Cheseldine
 G. Raymond Nye as Poggin
 Clarence Burton as Bland
 Lamar Johnstone as Captain Neil
 Henry J. Hebert as Cal Bain
 C. Edward Hatton as Stevens
 Louise Lovely as Jenny Lee
 Genevieve Blinn as Mrs Lee

See also
1937 Fox vault fire

References

External links
 {{IMDb title|id=0010344/?ref_=fn_al_tt_3 The Last of the Duanes at IMDb.com]
 

1919 films
1919 Western (genre) films
1919 lost films
American black-and-white films
Films based on short fiction
Films based on works by Zane Grey
Films directed by J. Gordon Edwards
Fox Film films
Lost American films
Lost Western (genre) films
Silent American Western (genre) films
1910s American films
1910s English-language films